Aleksandr Kozhevnikov may refer to:

 Aleksandr Igorevich Kozhevnikov (born 1990), Russian football player
 Aleksandr Kozhevnikov (ice hockey) (born 1958), Soviet Russian ice hockey player
 Alexandre Kojève (1902–1968), Russian-born French intellectual, born Kozhevnikov
 Oleksandr Kozhevnikov (born 2000), Ukrainian football player